Rob Hart (born 1982 - New York, USA) is an American author, novelist and former journalist. He is best known for his work The Warehouse and the Ash McKenna series.

Early life and education 
Hart was born and raised on Staten Island, New York City, New York. He graduated from Monsignor Farrell High School in 2000 and earned a degree in journalism from State University of New York at Purchase, in 2004.

Career 
Hart worked as a reporter for the Staten Island Advance, covering general assignment and state politics. Thereafter, he was the communications director for New York City Councilman Domenic Recchia. He was the publisher for Mysterious Press, where he published and edited crime and mystery novels, and currently the class director at LitReactor. He has written short stories for publications like Thuglit, Joyland, and Helix Literary Magazine.

His short stories appeared in sites like LitReactor, Salon.com, The Daily Beast, Criminal Element, The Literary Hub, Birth.Movies.Death, and Electric Literature.

He is the writer of the Ash McKenna novels, a five-book crime thriller series. The first entry, New Yorked, was nominated for an Anthony Award in the Best First Novel category in 2016.

In 2017, Hart collaborated with James Patterson on the mystery crime novel Scott Free. In 2018, The Warehouse was sold to Crown at Penguin Random House and the American film director, Ron Howard optioned the film rights for the book.

Hart wrote Due on Batuu, a short story in the 2020 Star Wars anthology From a Certain Point of View: The Empire Strikes Back, featuring the character Willrow Hood.

In 2022, Kirkus Reviews named The Paradox Hotel one of the best science fiction and fantasy books of the year.

Publications

Standalone books 

 The Last Safe Place: A Zombie Novella (2013)
 Take-Out: And Other Tales of Culinary Crime (2019)
 The Warehouse (2019)
 Blood Oath (2022)
 The Paradox Hotel (2022)

Ash McKenna series 

 New Yorked (2015)
 Bad Beat (2016)
 City of Rose (2016)
 South Village (2016)
 The Woman from Prague (2017)
 Potter's Field (2018)

References

External link 

 Official website

1982 births
Living people
Writers from Staten Island
21st-century American non-fiction writers
21st-century American novelists
21st-century American male writers
State University of New York at Purchase alumni
American male novelists